Parotocinclus britskii is a species from the genus Parotocinclus. The species was originally described by Marinus Boeseman in 1974.

References

Fish of Suriname
Taxa named by Marinus Boeseman
Fish described in 1974
Otothyrinae